Freshkills Park is a public park being built atop a former landfill on Staten Island. Its construction began in October 2008 and is slated to continue in phases for at least 30 years. When fully developed by 2035–37, Freshkills Park will be the second-largest park in New York City, after Pelham Bay Park in the Bronx, and almost three times the size of Central Park in Manhattan. The park is envisioned as a regional destination that integrates 2,200 acres of open grasslands, waterways and engineered structures into one cohesive and dynamic unit that will host a variety of public spaces and facilities for social, cultural and physical activity, learning and play. Sections of the park will be connected by a circulation system for vehicles and a network of paths for bicyclists and pedestrians. The New York City Department of Parks and Recreation (NYC Parks) is managing the project with the New York City Department of Sanitation.

History

Landfill

The landfill opened in 1948 in what was then a salt marsh in a rural agricultural area. The subsoil was clay, with a layer of sand and silt on top.  There were tidal wetlands, forests, and freshwater wetlands. The area  was considered prime for development because the value of wetlands in buffering storm surges and filtering water was not understood at the time.    

The initial plan was to raise the elevation of the land by filling for three years and then redevelop it as a multi-use area with residential, recreational, and industrial components. However, three years turned into fifty years. New York City's population was growing and generating more garbage and it was easy to expand the filling operation on Staten Island.  The landfill accepted garbage from 1948 through 2001. By 1955, the landfill was the largest in  the world. At the peak of its operation, the contents of twenty barges – each carrying 650 tons of garbage – were added to the site every day. Staten Islanders tried many times to close operations at the landfill and were finally successful in 1996 when regulations were passed to close the landfill by 2001.
In 2001 it was estimated that, if kept open, the landfill would have eventually become the highest point on the East Coast. Under strong community pressure and with support of the United States Environmental Protection Agency (EPA), the landfill site was closed on March 22, 2001, but it had to be reopened after the September 11 attacks on the World Trade Center in Manhattan. Virtually all the materials from the World Trade Center site were sent to the temporarily reopened landfill for examination. Thousands of detectives and forensic evidence specialists worked for over 1.7 million hours at Fresh Kills Landfill to try to recover the remains of people killed in the attacks. A final count of 4,257 human remains were recovered; the City's Chief Medical Examiner retains custody of all still-unidentified materials at a facility within the National 9/11 Memorial in Manhattan. The remaining materials at Fresh Kills were then buried in a 40-acre (160,000 m2) portion of the landfill that will be known as West Mound. Afterward, the landfill facility was closed permanently, in anticipation of the park on the site.

International design competitions

In 2001, the New York City Department of City Planning (NYCDCP) held an international design competition following the release of a Request for Proposal (RFP) for a landscape architecture firm to develop a master plan for the park. The competition's first round was open to all participants, and in August 2001, six landscape architecture proposals were chosen as finalists. These proposals came from: James Corner Field Operations, Hargreaves Associates, Mathur/da Cunha, Tom Leader Studio, John McAslan + Partners, RIOS Associates, Inc., and Sasaki Associates.    

In 2003, James Corner Field Operations was selected as the winner of the competition and was hired to prepare a draft master plan to guide long-term development of the park. The Draft Master Plan was prepared over the following years and released in March 2006.

In 2006, NYC Parks became the lead agency overseeing the park development process. In 2011, the Land Art Generator Initiative announced Freshkills Park as the site for a design competition, LAGI-NYC 2012. Although construction of the winning design was not guaranteed, the initiative hoped to bring international attention to the aesthetic potential of renewable energy infrastructure.

Planning

Draft Master Plan
The 2006 Draft Master Plan for Freshkills Park envisioned the site as five parks in one, each with a distinct character and programming approach. The Plan was developed with input gathered in meetings and workshops between the project team and Staten Islanders, nonprofit groups, and government officials. Goals emerging from the outreach efforts included: roads to ease traffic congestion surrounding the Freshkills Park site; active recreational uses such as kayaking, and sports fields; and projects generating and using renewable sources of energy. The planning process also included the input of a community advisory group  consisting of local leaders and stakeholders.

The five areas envisioned in the draft plan are described below:
 North Park: The 223-acre (0.90 km2) North Park will retain much of its natural character in order to expand the neighboring habitat of the William T. Davis Wildlife Refuge. North Park will largely be devoted to wildlife and passive recreation, though trails for biking, walking, and hiking will also be included
 South Park: Like North Park, South Park contains a significant amount of natural woodland and wetland, but also contains ample flat, non-wetland space for more active recreational uses. The draft master plan for this 425-acre (1.72 km2) site envisioned tennis courts, trails, athletic facilities, and an equestrian center.   
 East Park: At 482 acres (1.95 km2),  meadows, trails, playing fields and picnic areas were proposed for East Park. A golf course was also suggested as a means to generate revenue for operations.  A road system connecting Richmond Avenue and the West Shore Expressway has also been proposed for East Park.
 West Park: After the September 11 attacks at the World Trade Center, about 1,200,000 short tons (1,100,000 long tons) of materials were brought to the West Park site where it was carefully screened and sifted. The search effort did not end until all discernible materials were removed and taken to the Office of Chief Medical Examiner of the City of New York for identification and safekeeping.  The Department of Sanitation is still in the process of capping and closing this mound and no formal planning has been undertaken by Parks for this area.
 The Confluence: Located at the meeting point of the site's two creeks is a 70-acre (280,000 m2) area planned as the center of the park. The Confluence will host visitor and information centers, restaurants, a marina, event spaces and landscapes for passive recreation. Waterborne access to the area has been proposed via the waterways that previously permitted barge deliveries to the landfill.

Capital Projects 
Capital projects entail a complex and lengthy design and permitting process, involving both City and State agencies, to ensure that all landfill infrastructure as well as the developing ecological resources are adequately protected.  NYC Parks started park development around the outer edges of the park both to show the City's commitment to transforming the former landfill to local neighborhoods and  because permitting was easier. Those projects include:

  Schmul Park: The first  project in the Travis neighborhood, the renovation of Schmul Park was completed in 2012. Formerly an asphalt and chain-link fence playground, it was converted into a park with new play surfaces, basketball and handball courts, permeable substrate and concrete, and native plantings.
 Owl Hollow Soccer Fields: DPR then  undertook the construction of the Owl Hollow Soccer Fields, on the southeastern  side of the park.  This project  included four new AstroTurf fields located near the intersection of Arden  Avenue and Arthur Kill Road.  Two of the fields are lit at night for extended, a circular path and  parking.  The project was completed in 2013.
  New Springville Greenway: In 2015, NYC  Parks completed the construction of the New Springville Greenway- a new bike and pedestrian path that runs along the edge of Richmond Avenue.
  North Park Phase 1: In 2017, NYC Parks broke ground for North Park Phase 1, a 21-acre arc path that begins at the park entrance and takes visitors along the side of north mound to expansive views of the creeks and will include a composting comfort station, a bird tower and a wetland overlook deck.  This park also has a path connecting it to Schmul Park. This project will be complete in 2021.
 South Park Anchor Park: In 2016, $30 million in funding was allocated to Freshkills Park as part of the city's Anchor Parks program.  The South Park Anchor Park project is in design and includes walking paths, two multi-purpose fields, a comfort station and parking.  Design is anticipated to be complete in November 2020.

Solar array
In March 2012, NYC released A Request for Proposals for the construction of solar and/or wind energy facilities.     The project for the construction of solar arrays was awarded to SunEdison in November 2013.  NYC was in contractual negotiations with SunEdison when the company went bankrupt in 2016. No further work has been done with renewable energy at Freshkills Park since that time.

Wildlife
The in-construction park is home to a diverse array of wildlife; a 2015 BioBlitz recorded 320 species of plants and animals in a 24-hr period. Ongoing ecological research projects are tracking some of the changes in wildlife as the site transforms from industrial space to green space. Current projects include fish population monitoring, grassland habitat characterization, migratory bird banding, grassland bird monitoring, and bat population monitoring. Over 200 species of birds have been seen at the park either nesting, migrating, hunting, or foraging. Freshkills Park is now home to the largest nesting colony of Grasshopper Sparrows in New York State–a NYS Species of Special Concern which began nesting on-site in 2015. Common wildlife species at Freshkills Park include Red-winged Blackbirds, American Goldfinches, Red-tailed Hawks, American Kestrels, Osprey, Ring-necked Pheasants, Tree Swallows, Turkey Vultures, Northern Harriers, Savannah Sparrows, American Woodcock, white-tailed deer, muskrat, red foxes, northern snapping turtles and diamondback terrapins.

Programs
While Freshkills Park continues its development, NYC Parks and the Freshkills Park Alliance have hosted events and programs including active recreation on-site, in areas generally closed to the public. The park is open to the public on bi-annual Discovery Days in the spring and fall, when visitors have the opportunity to kayak, bike, hike, and fly kites on a closed section of the park.  The Freshkills Park Alliance runs educational and public programs in closed sections of the park, including kayaking, cycling and running events, citizen science, art projects, tours, and field trips. Beginning in 2020, Freshkills Park began offering virtual field trips and programming.  The Freshkills Park office regularly partners with cultural and academic organizations on Staten Island and in NYC for these programs.

Landfill operations and state regulations

The Fresh Kills Landfill actively received New York City's municipal waste from 1947 to 2001. Two of the four mounds at the sitethe mounds referred to as North and Southwere capped in the late 1990s with an impermeable cover separating waste from the environment. Capping of the East Mound, which will become East Park, began in 2007 and was completed in 2011. Capping of the West Mound began in 2011 and is currently scheduled to be complete in 2022. The Department of Sanitation works with the New York State Department of Environmental Conservation (NYSDEC) to meet regulations for environmentally sound landfill closure; it will also maintain operating responsibility for on–site environmental monitoring and control systems after capping. NYC Parks must also meet NYSDEC's regulationsno area of the park is permitted to open to public access until it meets state standards for public access.

NYC Parks completed and released the Final Generic Environmental Impact Statement (FGEIS) for the Freshkills Park project in May 2009. The document evaluates the entirety of the proposed project and its likely effects on the neighboring community. In compliance with state and local law, the FGEIS is designed to identify "any adverse environmental effects of proposed actions, assess their significance, and propose measures to eliminate or mitigate significant impacts". A Supplemental Environmental Impact Statement (SEIS) was also completed in October 2009, which specifically focuses on the impact of proposed road construction through the East Park section of the plan and examines alternatives to the current plan. These environmental assessments are updated on a project by project basis, during the design phase, to ensure that any new or undisclosed environmental impacts are also identified and addressed

References

External links
 Freshkills Park: New York City Department of Parks & Recreation information section
 Freshkills Park Blog
 Video: Inside Freshkills Park, 2009

Urban public parks
Parks in Staten Island